Pulitzer's thick-toed gecko (Chondrodactylus pulitzerae) is a species of gecko, a lizard in the family Gekkonidae. The species is endemic to southern Africa.

Etymology
The specific name, pulitzerae, is feminine, genitive, singular. Schmidt did not specify whom he meant to honor. It may commemorate Margaret Pulitzer, second wife of Ralph Pulitzer, both whom were members of the Pulitzer Angola Expedition, or it may commemorate their infant daughter who had died of polio.

Geographic range
C. pulitzerae is found from northern Namibia through southern Angola.

References

Further reading
Schmidt KP (1933). "The Reptiles of the Pulitzer Angola Expedition". Annals of the Carnegie Museum 22 (1): 1–15. (Pachydactylus bibronii pulitzerae, new subspecies, p. 6).

Chondrodactylus
Reptiles described in 1933